Kelley Loe (1881 – September 4, 1957) was a U.S. labor activist, writer, and newspaper proprietor in the Pacific Northwest during the first half of the 20th century.

He was the founder of the LaCamas Post of Camas, Washington, and owned and edited the newspaper in 1908. It later became the Camas Post-Record, and survived until 1965.

Loe was also the founder of the Ridgefield Reflector of Ridgefield, Washington, and owning and editing the newspaper from 1909 to 1910. It later became The Reflector, and is still in publication, now in Battle Ground, Washington.

During the Great Depression, Loe was a spokesman and organizer for the American Federation of Labor. He died on September 4, 1957, in Portland, Oregon. He was 76.

Upon his death and in his honor, beginning in 1957 and through the 1970s, the Labor's Community Service Agency, a labor-affiliated charity organization in Portland, Oregon, gave a "Kelley Loe Award" for distinguished service.

Writings 
 An Army of the Aged. Caldwell : Caxton Press, 1936. (Co-written by Richard L. Neuberger.)

References

External links 
 The Reflector website

1881 births
1957 deaths
People from Ridgefield, Washington